50 Reasons to Hate the French: Vive La Difference? is a humorous book by Jules Eden and Alex Clarke that takes an irreverent look at French politics, food, geography, business, and history, in order to delineate just what makes France so "exceptionnel".  Published in London on August 3, 2006 by Quetzal Publishing, it has since been released in the United States by Ivan R. Dee.

In the introduction the authors write, 

The book is arranged into fifty chapters, each one examining some aspect of France  from politics to sports to cuisine to history to pop music. While this is a book of journalistic humour, the authors substantiate their views throughout with tables, facts and quotes.

Writing in The Literary Review of April 2006, critic Alexander Waugh described the book:

References

Comedy books
Cultural depictions of French people
2006 non-fiction books
Francophobia in Europe